Moonshot is a 2009 television film depicting the story leading up to the landing of Apollo 11's Lunar Module Eagle on the surface of the Moon on 20 July 1969.

Cast
 James Marsters as Buzz Aldrin
 Andrew Lincoln as Michael Collins
 Ursula Burton as Marilyn Lovell
 Daniel Lapaine as Neil Armstrong
 William Hope as Psychologist
 Anna Maxwell Martin as Janet Armstrong
 Colin Stinton as Bob Gilruth
 Michael J. Reynolds as Gene Aldrin
 Nigel Whitmey as Deke Slayton
 Richard Dillane as Tom Stafford
 Ian Porter as Bill Anders

Production
The film utilizes actual footage taken during the time period known as the Space Race.

See also
 Apollo 11 in popular culture

References

External links

2009 television films
2009 films
Films about astronauts
Films about the Apollo program
Science docudramas
Films set in 1969
Cultural depictions of Neil Armstrong
Cultural depictions of Buzz Aldrin
Cultural depictions of Michael Collins (astronaut)
2009 drama films
British docudrama films
2000s British films
British drama television films